Left-hand traffic (LHT) and right-hand traffic (RHT) are the practices, in bidirectional traffic, of keeping to the left side or to the right side of the road, respectively. They are fundamental to traffic flow, and are sometimes referred to as the rule of the road. The terms right- and left-hand drive refer to the position of the driver and the steering wheel in the vehicle and are, in automobiles, the reverse of the terms right- and left-hand traffic. The rule also extends to where on the road a vehicle is to be driven, if there is room for more than one vehicle in the one direction, as well as the side on which the vehicle in the rear overtakes the one in the front. For example, a driver in an LHT country would typically overtake on the right of the vehicle being overtaken.

RHT is used in 165 countries and territories, with the remaining 75 countries and territories using LHT.

Countries that use left-hand traffic account for about a sixth of the world's land area, with about a third of its population, and a quarter of its roads. In 1919, 104 of the world's territories were LHT and an equal number were RHT. Between 1919 and 1986, 34 of the LHT territories switched to RHT.

Many of the countries that adopted LHT were formerly part of the British Empire, although some, such as Indonesia, Japan, Mozambique, Nepal, Suriname, Sweden (RHT since 1967), Thailand, and the city Macau were not. Similarly, many of the countries that were a part of the French colonial empire adopted RHT.

In LHT, traffic keeps left and cars usually have the steering wheel on the right (RHD – right hand drive) and roundabouts circulate clockwise. RHT is the opposite of this: traffic keeps right, the driver usually sits on the left side of the car (LHD – left hand drive), and roundabouts circulate counterclockwise.

In most countries, rail traffic follows the handedness of the roads, although many of the countries that switched road traffic from LHT to RHT did not switch their trains. Boat traffic on rivers is always RHT, regardless of location. Boats are traditionally piloted from the starboard side to facilitate priority to the right.

History

Historically, many places kept left, while many others kept right, often within the same country. There are many myths that attempt to explain why one or the other is preferred. About 90 percent of people are right-handed, and many explanations reference this. Horses are traditionally mounted from the left, and led from the left, with the reins in the right hand. So people walking horses might use RHT, to keep the animals separated. Also referenced is the need for pedestrians to keep their swords in the right hand and pass on the left as in LHT, for self-defence. It has been suggested that wagon-drivers whipped their horses with their right hand, and thus sat on the left-hand side of the wagon, as in RHT. Academic Chris McManus notes that writers have stated that in the year 1300, Pope Boniface VIII directed pilgrims to keep left; however, others suggest that he directed them to keep to the right, and there is no documented evidence to back either claim.

Europe

In a study of the ancient traffic system of Pompeii, Eric Poehler was able to show that drivers of carts drove in the middle of the road whenever possible. This was the case even on roads wide enough for two lanes. The wear marks on the kerbstones, however, prove that when there were two lanes of traffic, and the volume of traffic made it necessary to divide the lanes, the drivers always drove on the right-hand side. These considerations can also be demonstrated in the archaeological findings of other cities in the Roman Empire.

One of the first references in England to requiring traffic direction was an order by the London Court of Aldermen in 1669, requiring a man to be posted on London Bridge to ensure that "all cartes going to keep on the one side and all cartes coming to keep on the other side". It was later legislated as the London Bridge Act 1765 (29 Geo. II c. 40), which required that "all carriages passing over the said bridge from London shall go on the east side thereof" – those going south to remain on the east, i.e. the left-hand side by direction of travel. This may represent the first statutory requirement for LHT.

In the Kingdom of Ireland, a law of 1793 (1793 [33 Geo. 3] c. 56) provided a ten-shilling fine to anyone not driving or riding on the left side of the road within the county of the city of Dublin, and required the local road overseers to erect written or printed notices informing road users of the law. The Road in Down and Antrim Act of 1798 (1798 [38 Geo. 3] c. 28) required drivers on the road from Dublin to Donadea to keep to the left. This time, the punishment was ten shillings if the offender was not the owner of the vehicle, or one Irish pound (twenty shillings) if he/she was. The Grand Juries (Ireland) Act 1836 mandated LHT for the whole country, violators to be fined up to five shillings and imprisoned in default for up to one month.

An oft-repeated story is that Napoleon changed the custom from LHT to RHT in France and the countries he conquered after the French Revolution. Scholars who have looked for documentary evidence of this story have found none, and contemporary sources have not surfaced, as of 1999. In 1827, long after Napoleon's reign, Edward Planta wrote that, in Paris, "The coachmen have no established rule by which they drive on the right or left of the road, but they cross and jostle one another without ceremony."

Rotterdam was LHT until 1917, although the rest of the Netherlands was RHT.

In Russia, in 1709, the Danish envoy under Tsar Peter the Great noted the widespread custom for traffic in Russia to pass on the right, but it was only in 1752 that Empress Elizabeth officially issued an edict for traffic to keep to the right.

After the Austro-Hungarian Empire broke up, the resulting countries gradually changed to RHT. In Austria, Vorarlberg switched in 1921, North Tyrol in 1930, Carinthia and East Tyrol in 1935, and the rest of the country in 1938. In Romania, Transylvania, the Banat and Bukovina were LHT until 1919, while Wallachia and Moldavia were already RHT. Partitions of Poland belonging to the German Empire and the Russian Empire were RHT, while the former Austrian Partition changed in the 1920s. Croatia-Slavonia switched on joining the Kingdom of Yugoslavia in 1918, although Istria and Dalmatia were already RHT. The switch in Czechoslovakia from LHT to RHT had been planned for 1939, but was accelerated by the start of the German occupation of Czechoslovakia that year. Similarly, Hungary switched in 1941. West Ukraine was LHT, but the rest of Ukraine, having been part of the Russian Empire, was RHT.

In Italy, it had been decreed in 1901 that each province define its own traffic code, including the handedness of traffic, and the 1903 Baedeker guide reported that the rule of the road varied by region. For example, in Northern Italy, the provinces of Brescia, Como, Vicenza, and Ravenna were RHT while nearby provinces of Lecco, Verona, and Varese were LHT, as were the cities Milan, Turin, and Florence. In 1915, allied forces of World War I imposed LHT in areas of military operation, but this was revoked in 1918. Rome was reported by Goethe as LHT in the 1780s. Naples was also LHT although surrounding areas were often RHT. In cities, LHT was considered safer since pedestrians, accustomed to keeping right, could better see oncoming vehicular traffic. Finally, in 1923 Italian Duce Benito Mussolini decreed that all LHT areas would gradually transition to RHT. In spite of this, some Italian heavy commercial vehicles were right-hand drive until the traffic code was changed in 1959.

Portugal switched to RHT in 1928.

Finland, formerly part of LHT Sweden, switched to RHT in 1858 as the Grand Duchy of Finland by Russian decree.

Sweden switched to RHT in 1967, having been LHT from about 1734 despite having land borders with RHT countries, and approximately 90% of cars being left-hand drive (LHD). A referendum in 1955 overwhelmingly rejected a change to RHT, but, a few years later, the government ordered it and it occurred on Sunday, 3 September 1967 at 5 am. The accident rate then dropped sharply, but soon rose to near its original level. The day was known as Högertrafikomläggningen, or Dagen H for short.

When Iceland switched to RHT the following year, it was known as Hægri dagurinn or H-dagurinn ("The H-Day"). Most passenger cars in Iceland were already LHD.

The United Kingdom is LHT, but two of its overseas territories, Gibraltar and the British Indian Ocean Territory, are RHT. In the late 1960s, the British Department for Transport considered switching to RHT, but declared it unsafe and too costly for such a built-up nation. Road building standards, for motorways in particular, allow asymmetrically designed road junctions, where merge and diverge lanes differ in length.

Today, four countries in Europe continue to use LHT; they are all island nations: the United Kingdom, Republic of Ireland (formerly part of the United Kingdom), Cyprus and Malta (both former British colonies).

Africa

LHT was introduced in British West Africa. All of the countries formerly part of this colony border with former French RHT jurisdictions and have switched to RHT since decolonization. These include Ghana, Gambia, Sierra Leone, and Nigeria. Britain introduced LHT to the East Africa Protectorate (now Kenya, Tanzania and Uganda), Rhodesia, and the Cape Colony (now Zambia, Zimbabwe and South Africa). All of these have remained LHT. Sudan, formerly part of Anglo-Egyptian Sudan switched to RHT in 1973, as most of its neighbours were RHT countries, with the exception of Uganda and Kenya, but since the independence of South Sudan in 2011, all of its neighbours drive on the right. Despite it sharing land borders with two LHT countries, South Sudan has retained RHT. The Portuguese Empire, then LHT, introduced LHT to Portuguese Mozambique and Portuguese Angola. Although Portugal itself switched to RHT in 1928, Mozambique remained LHT as they have land borders with former British colonies. Other former Portuguese colonies in Africa including Portuguese Angola, Guinea-Bissau, São Tomé and Príncipe, and Cape Verde switched to RHT in 1928.

France introduced RHT in French West Africa and the Maghreb, where it is still used. Countries in these areas include Mali, Mauritania, Ivory Coast, Burkina Faso, Benin, Niger, Morocco, Algeria, and Tunisia. Other French former colonies that are RHT include Cameroon, Central African Republic, Chad, Djibouti, Gabon, and the Republic of the Congo.

Rwanda and Burundi are RHT but are considering switching to LHT (see "Potential future shifts" section below).

North America

In the late 1700s, traffic in the United States was RHT based on teamsters' use of large freight wagons pulled by several pairs of horses. The wagons had no driver's seat, so the (typically right-handed) postilion held his whip in his right hand and thus sat on the left rear horse. Seated on the left, the driver preferred that other wagons pass him on the left so that he would have a clear view of other vehicles. The first keep-right law for driving in the United States was passed in 1792 and applied to the Philadelphia and Lancaster Turnpike. Massachusetts formalized RHT in 1821. However, the National Road was LHT until 1850, "long after the rest of the country had settled on the keep-right convention". Today the United States is RHT except the United States Virgin Islands, which is LHT like many neighbouring islands.

Some special-purpose vehicles in the United States, including certain postal service trucks, garbage trucks, and parking-enforcement vehicles, are built with the driver's seat on the right for safer and easier access to the curb. A common example is the Grumman LLV, which is used nationwide by the US Postal Service.

As former French colonies, the provinces of Quebec and Ontario were always RHT. The province of British Columbia changed to RHT in stages from 1920 to 1923. New Brunswick, Nova Scotia, and Prince Edward Island, changed to RHT in 1922, 1923, and 1924 respectively. Newfoundland, then a British colony, changed to RHT in 1947, two years before joining Canada.

In the West Indies, colonies and territories drive on the same side as their parent countries, except for the United States Virgin Islands. Many of the island nations are former British colonies and drive on the left, including Jamaica, Antigua and Barbuda, Barbados, Dominica, Grenada, Saint Kitts and Nevis, Saint Lucia, Saint Vincent and the Grenadines, Trinidad and Tobago, and The Bahamas. However, most vehicles in The Bahamas, Cayman Islands, Turks and Caicos Islands and both the British Virgin Islands, and the United States Virgin Islands are LHD due to them being imported from the United States.

Asia

LHT was introduced by the British in British India (now India, Pakistan, Myanmar, and Bangladesh), British Malaya and British Borneo (now Malaysia, Brunei and Singapore), and British Hong Kong. All are still LHT except Myanmar, which switched to RHT in 1970, although much of its infrastructure is still geared to LHT. Most cars are used RHD vehicles imported from Japan. Afghanistan was LHT until the 1950s, in line with neighbouring British India and later Pakistan.

LHT was introduced by the Portuguese Empire in Portuguese Macau (now Macau) and Portuguese Timor (now East Timor). Both places are still LHT, despite Macau now being part of RHT China, requiring a right-to-left switching interchange at the Lotus Bridge that connects the two. East Timor shares the island of Timor with Indonesia, which is also LHT, although the former (then Portuguese Timor) switched to RHT along with Portugal in 1928 before changing back to LHT in 1976 during the Indonesian occupation of East Timor.

China is RHT except the special administrative regions of Hong Kong and Macau. In the 1930s, parts of China, like the British Concession of Shanghai, used LHT, as well as northeast China under the Japanese occupation. Nationalist China adopted RHT in 1946, which was preserved when the CCP took the mainland and the KMT retreated to Taiwan.

Taiwan has used RHT since 1946, after the Japanese occupation, during which LHT was used.

Both North Korea and South Korea uses RHT since 1946, after liberation from Japanese colonial power.

The Philippines was mostly LHT during its Spanish and American colonial periods, as well as during the Commonwealth era. During the Japanese occupation, the Philippines remained LHT, also because LHT had been required by the Japanese; but during the Battle of Manila, the liberating American forces drove their tanks to the right for easier facilitation of movement. RHT was formalized in 1945 through a decree by then-president Sergio Osmeña. Even though RHT was formalized, RHD vehicles such as public buses were still imported in the Philippines until a law was passed that banned the importation of RHD vehicles except for special cases. These RHD vehicles are required to be converted to LHD

Japan was never part of the British Empire, but its traffic also drives on the left. Although the origin of this habit goes back to the Edo period (1603–1868), it was not until 1872 – the year Japan's first railway was introduced, built with technical aid from the British – that this unwritten rule received official acknowledgment. Gradually, a massive network of railways and tram tracks was built, with all railway vehicles driven on the left-hand side. However, it took another half-century, until 1924, until left-hand traffic was legally mandated. Post-World War II Okinawa was ruled by the United States Civil Administration of the Ryukyu Islands and was RHT. It was returned to Japan in 1972 and converted back to LHT on 30 July 1978. The conversion operation was known as 730 (Nana-San-Maru, which refers to the date of the changeover). Okinawa is one of few places to have changed from RHT to LHT in the late 20th century.

Vietnam became RHT as part of French Indochina, as did Laos and Cambodia. In Cambodia, RHD cars, many of which were smuggled from Thailand, were banned from 2001, even though they accounted for 80% of vehicles in the country.

Oceania 

Many former British colonies in the region have always been LHT, including Australia, New Zealand, Fiji, Kiribati, Solomon Islands, Tonga, and Tuvalu; and nations that were previously administered by Australia: Nauru and Papua New Guinea.

New Zealand 
Initially traffic was slow and very sparse, but, as early as 1856, a newspaper said, "The cart was near to the right hand kerb. According to the rules of the road, it should have been on the left side. In turning sharp round a right-hand corner, a driver should keep away to the opposite side." That rule was codified when the first Highway Code was written in 1936.

Samoa 
Samoa, a former German colony, had been RHT for more than a century, but switched to LHT in 2009, making it the first territory in almost 30 years to change sides. The move was legislated in 2008 to allow Samoans to use cheaper vehicles imported from Australia, New Zealand, or Japan, and to harmonise with other South Pacific nations. A political party, The People's Party, was formed by the group People Against Switching Sides (PASS) to protest against the change, with PASS launching a legal challenge; in April 2008 an estimated 18,000 people attended demonstrations against switching. The motor industry was also opposed, as 14,000 of Samoa's 18,000 vehicles were designed for RHT and the government refused to meet the cost of conversion. After months of preparation, the switch from right to left happened in an atmosphere of national celebration. There were no reported incidents. At 05:50 local time, Monday 7 September, a radio announcement halted traffic, and an announcement at 6:00 ordered traffic to switch to LHT. The change coincided with more restrictive enforcement of speeding and seat-belt laws. That day and the following were declared public holidays, to reduce traffic. The change included a three-day ban on alcohol sales, while police mounted dozens of checkpoints, warning drivers to drive slowly.

South America 

Brazil was a colony of Portugal until the early 19th century and during this century and the early 20th century had mixed rules, with some regions still on LHT, switching these remaining regions to RHT in 1928, the same year Portugal switched sides. Other Central and South American countries that later switched from LHT to RHT include Argentina, Chile, Panama, Paraguay, and Uruguay.

Suriname, along with neighbouring Guyana, are the only two remaining LHT countries in South America.

Potential future shifts 

Rwanda and Burundi, former Belgian colonies in Central Africa, are RHT but are considering switching to LHT like neighbouring members of the East African Community (EAC). A survey in 2009 found that 54% of Rwandans favoured the switch. Reasons cited were the perceived lower costs of RHD vehicles, easier maintenance and the political benefit of harmonising traffic regulations with other EAC countries. The survey indicated that RHD cars were 16% to 49% cheaper than their LHD counterparts. In 2014, an internal report by consultants to the Ministry of Infrastructure recommended a switch to LHT. In 2015, the ban on RHD vehicles was lifted; RHD trucks from neighbouring countries cost $1000 less than LHD models imported from Europe.

Changing sides at borders

Although many LHT jurisdictions are on islands, there are cases where vehicles may be driven from LHT across a border into a RHT area. Such borders are mostly located in Africa and southern Asia. The Vienna Convention on Road Traffic regulates the use of foreign registered vehicles in the 78 countries that have ratified it.

LHT Thailand has three RHT neighbours: Cambodia, Laos, and Myanmar. Most of its borders use a simple traffic light to do the switch, but there are also interchanges that enable the switch while keeping up a continuous flow of traffic.

There are four road border crossing points between Hong Kong and mainland China. In 2006, the daily average number of vehicle trips recorded at Lok Ma Chau was 31,100. The next largest is Man Kam To, where there is no changeover system and the border roads on the mainland side Wenjindu intersect as one-way streets with a main road.

The Takutu River Bridge (which links LHT Guyana and RHT Brazil) is the only border in the Americas where traffic changes sides.

Although the United Kingdom is separated from Continental Europe by the English Channel, the level of cross-Channel traffic is very high; the Channel Tunnel alone carries 3.5 million vehicles per year by the Eurotunnel Shuttle between the UK and France.

Road vehicle configurations

Steering wheel position

In RHT jurisdictions, vehicles are typically configured as left hand drive (LHD), with the steering wheel on the left side of the passenger compartment. In LHT jurisdictions, the reverse is true as the right hand drive (RHD) configuration. In most jurisdictions, the position of the steering wheel is not regulated, or explicitly permitted to be anywhere. The driver's side, the side closer to the centre of the road, is sometimes called the offside, while the passenger side, the side closer to the side of the road, is sometimes called the nearside.

Most windscreen wipers are preferentially designed to better clean the driver's side of the windscreen and thus have a longer wiper blade on the driver's side and wipe up from the passenger side to the driver's side. Thus on LHD configurations, they wipe up from right to left, viewed from inside the vehicle, and do the opposite on RHD vehicles.

Historically there was less consistency in the relationship of the position of the driver to the handedness of traffic. Most American cars produced before 1910 were RHD. In 1908 Henry Ford standardised the Model T as LHD in RHT America, arguing that with RHD and RHT, the passenger was obliged to "get out on the street side and walk around the car" and that with steering from the left, the driver "is able to see even the wheels of the other car and easily avoids danger." By 1915 other manufacturers followed Ford's lead, due to the popularity of the Model T.

In specialised cases, the driver will sit on the nearside, or curbside. Examples include:
Where the driver needs a good view of the nearside, e.g. street sweepers, or vehicles driven along unstable road edges. Similarly in mountainous areas the driver may be seated opposite side so that they have a better view of the road edge which may fall away for very many metres into the valley below. Swiss Postbuses in mountainous areas are a well known example.
Where it is more convenient for the driver to be on the nearside, e.g. delivery vehicles. The Grumman LLV postal delivery truck is widely used with RHD configurations in RHT North America. Some Unimogs are designed to switch between LHD and RHD to permit operators to work on the more convenient side of the truck.

Generally, the convention is to mount a motorcycle on the left, and kickstands are usually on the left which makes it more convenient to mount on the safer kerbside as is the case in LHT. Some jurisdictions prohibit fitting a sidecar to a motorcycle's offside.

In 2020, there were 160 LHD heavy goods vehicles in the UK involved in accidents (%) for a total of 3175 accidents, killing 215 people (%) for a total of 4271.

It has been suggested that right-hand drive vehicles, and hence the left-hand traffic direction, are associated with greater safety. As most drivers are right-handed, the dominant right hand remains controlled on the steering wheel while the non-dominant left hand can manipulate gears. The right field of vision may also be more dominant, thereby permitting a superior view of oncoming traffic.

Dashboard configuration

Some manufacturers primarily produce left-hand drive vehicles, due to the larger or nearer market for such vehicles. For such models supplied to left-hand traffic markets, in the right-hand drive configuration, the manufacturer may reuse the same dashboard configuration as is used in the left-hand drive models, with the steering column and pedals moved to the right-hand side. Oft-used controls (such as audio volume and climate controls) that were placed near the left-hand driver for ease of access, are now situated on the far side of the center console for the right-hand driver. This may make them more difficult to reach quickly or without looking away from the road ahead.

In some cases, the manufacturer's dashboard design incorporates blanks and modular components, which permits the controls and underlying electronics to be rearranged to suite the right-hand drive model. This may be done in the factory, after import, or as an after-market modification.

Headlamps and other lighting equipment

Most low-beam headlamps produce an asymmetrical light suitable for use on only one side of the road. Low beam headlamps in LHT jurisdictions throw most of their light forward-leftward; those for RHT throw most of their light forward-rightward, thus illuminating obstacles and road signs while minimising glare for oncoming traffic.

In Europe, headlamps approved for use on one side of the road must be adaptable to produce adequate illumination with controlled glare for temporarily driving on the other side of the road,. This may be achieved by affixing masking strips or prismatic lenses to a part of the lens or by moving all or part of the headlamp optic so all or part of the beam is shifted or the asymmetrical portion is occluded. Some varieties of the projector-type headlamp can be fully adjusted to produce a proper LHT or RHT beam by shifting a lever or other movable element in or on the lamp assembly. Some vehicles adjust the headlamps automatically when the car's GPS detects that the vehicle has moved from LHT to RHT and vice versa.

Rear fog lamps
In Europe since early 1980s, cars must be equipped with one or two red rear fog lamps. A single rear fog lamp must be located between the vehicle's longitudinal centreline and the outer extent of the driver's side of the vehicle.

Crash testing differences
ANCAP reports that some RHD cars imported to Australia did not perform as well on crash tests as the LHD versions, although the cause is unknown, and may be due to differences in testing methodology.

Rail traffic

In most countries rail traffic travels on the same side as road traffic. However, there are many instances of railways built using LHT British technology which remained LHT despite their nations' road traffic becoming RHT. Examples include: Argentina, Belgium, Bolivia, Cambodia, Chile, Egypt, France, Iraq, Israel, Italy, Laos, Monaco, Morocco, Myanmar, Nigeria, Peru, Portugal, Senegal, Slovenia, Sweden, Switzerland, Taiwan, Tunisia, Uruguay and Venezuela. In Indonesia it is the reverse (RHT for rails (even for newer rail systems such as the LRT and the MRT systems) and LHT for roads). France is mainly LHT for trains except for the classic lines in Alsace–Lorraine, which were converted from LHT to RHT under German administration from 1870 to 1918, along with most metro systems. China is primarily LHT for long-distance trains and RHT for metro systems. Spain has RHT for railways but the metros uses LHT (in Madrid and Bilbao trains run completely on the left, while Barcelona metro is mostly RHT, but some LHT). In North America, multi-track rail lines with centralized traffic control are typically signaled to allow operation on any track in both directions, and the side of operation will vary based on the railroad's specific operational requirements.

Metro and light rail sides of operation vary and might not match railways or roads in their country. Apart from the aforementioned Madrid and Bilbao, such systems include those in Buenos Aires, Cairo, Catania, Jakarta, Lima, Lisbon, Lyon, Naples, Rome and Stockholm. In some metro systems (Hong Kong, Seoul, Nizhniy Novgorod) certain lines differ from the majority. Because trams frequently operate on roads, they generally operate on the same side as other road traffic.

Boat traffic

Boats are traditionally piloted from starboard (the right-hand side) to facilitate priority to the right. 
According to the International Regulations for Preventing Collisions at Sea, water traffic is effectively RHT: a vessel proceeding along a narrow channel must keep to starboard, and when two power-driven vessels are meeting head-on both must alter course to starboard also.

Aircraft traffic
For aircraft the US Federal Aviation Regulations suggest RHT principles, both in the air and on water, and in aircraft with side-by-side cockpit seating, the pilot-in-command (or more senior flight officer) traditionally occupies the left seat. However, helicopter practice tends to favour the right hand seat for the pilot-in-command, particularly when flying solo.

Worldwide distribution by country

Of the 195 countries currently recognised by the United Nations, 141 use RHT and 54 use LHT on roads in general. A country and its territories and dependencies are counted as one. Whichever directionality is listed first is the type that is used in general in the traffic category.

Legality of wrong-hand-drive vehicles by country

According to the Vienna Convention on Road Traffic, which mostly covers Europe, if having a vehicle registered and legal to drive in one of the Convention countries, it is legal to drive it in any other of the countries, for visits and first year of residence after moving. This is regardless if it does not fulfil all rules of the visitor countries. This convention does not affect rules on usage or registration of local vehicles.

Gallery

See also
Hook turn
Traffic-light signalling and operation
World Forum for Harmonization of Vehicle Regulations

Explanatory notes

References

External links

 Google Maps placemarks of border crossings where traffic changes sides (placemarks file, requires Google Earth)
 The Extraordinary Street Railways of Asunción, Paraguay

Chirality
Driving
Road transport
Rules of the road
Traffic law